William J. Maddox Jr (May 22, 1921 – January 5, 2001) was a United States Army Aviator and a major general in the United States Army. During his career he amassed over 10,500 flying hours, almost 4,000 of those in combat over Korea, Vietnam and Cambodia.

He served three tours in Vietnam, the last as the commander of an armored division. In 1976, he commanded the United States Army Aviation Center. Maddox was instrumental in identifying the need for air mobility, developing a management structure that ensured the Army met its aviation objectives. Maddox is one of army's most highly decorated aviators.

Biography
Maddox was born on May 22, 1921, in Newburgh, New York. He was a graduate of Wilson High School in Washington D.C. and Michigan State University. He received a master's degree in international relations from George Washington University. Maddox was married to Jaye Maddox (née Kurusu). They had one son and daughter. Jaye Maddox died in 1999.

After his retirement from the Army, he served as Advisor to King Hussein of Jordan and served as the commandant of Jordanian Aviation Academy. He later served as Managing Director of Arabian Helicopters in Saudi Arabia, and as Managing Director of Bell Helicopters in Asia.

Maddox died on January 5, 2001, due to sepsis at a hospital in Bedford, Texas. He is buried at Arlington National Cemetery.

Awards and decorations
Maddox is one of the most decorated Army Aviators. His awards include:

See also
 Army aviation

References

1921 births
2001 deaths
United States Army generals
American Master Army Aviators
United States Army personnel of the Vietnam War
Recipients of the Distinguished Service Order (Vietnam)
United States Army personnel of the Korean War
Recipients of the Air Medal
Recipients of the Distinguished Flying Cross (United States)
Recipients of the Silver Star
Burials at Arlington National Cemetery
Michigan State University alumni
George Washington University alumni
American expatriates in Jordan
American expatriates in Saudi Arabia